Shanghai Business Review (Pinyin: Shànghǎi Shāngyè Pínglùn; also referred to as SBR) provides international and local business information on China and its enterprises. Founded in 2004, SBR currently operates as an English-language bi-monthly business magazine and news website produced in Shanghai and published by Middle Kingdom Media Ltd. in Hong Kong.

The magazine focuses on providing a comprehensive summary of the main business developments in China and on issues of practical importance to international companies in China's leading commercial city, Shanghai, and the surrounding economic region. SBR provides a weekly newsletter on business highlights and daily online news briefs for those interested in keeping up with the news.

SBR is an English business magazine and counts the senior management of all the global Fortune 500 companies operating in Shanghai among its readerships. Over more than a decade of coverage, SBR has monitored the meteoric rise of China as an economic superpower and global business force. As such, SBR has interviewed many leading business and government personalities.

Shanghai Business Review provides its readers with pertinent news and information on a daily basis via its website (www.sbrchina.com), its mobile application SBR Mobile, and its weekly e-newsletter (SBR Weekly Briefing). Each issue of the SBR print version is read by more than 50,000 leading business professionals working in over 20,000 companies across China. In addition, a select circulation reaches business and government leaders around the Asia-Pacific region from Australia to Thailand as well as in the Middle East, Turkey, and the Philippines. More than 50% of the magazine's readers are management executives, managing directors, and chief representatives. Over 80% are country heads, general managers or heads of department, vice presidents, and directors.

Editorial
Shanghai Business Review's coverage primarily focuses on the key issues relevant to senior management of international companies operating in and around Shanghai and across China. Special Reports include Country Focus, Industry Review, Sector Survey, and City Focus along with regular columns such as Market Insights, View from the Top, News Briefs, and Offshore Regulatory Review.

Country Focus looks at the activities in China of companies from a particular foreign country and the contribution they make to the growth and economic development of Shanghai and the Yangtze River Delta region. Throughout 2022, in-depth Country Focus reports covered Jordan, Turkey, Pakistan, Italy, Germany, the Philippines, Thailand, United States, and more. Industry Focus, Sector Survey, and City Focus are comprehensive overviews of recent business trends, profiles of the leading companies and a look at the investment opportunities in a particular industry sector or Chinese city.

References

External links
 Official website

2004 establishments in China
News magazines published in Asia
Business magazines published in China
Monthly magazines published in China
Magazines established in 2004
Magazines published in Shanghai